The year 1981 was the 10th year after the independence of Bangladesh. It was also the last year of the Government of Ziaur Rahman and the first year of the Government of President Abdus Sattar

Incumbents

 President: Ziaur Rahman (until 30 May), Abdus Sattar (starting 30 May)
 Prime Minister: Shah Azizur Rahman
 Chief Justice: Kemaluddin Hossain

Demography

Climate

Economy

Note: For the year 1981 average official exchange rate for BDT was 17.99 per US$.

Events
 17 May - Sheikh Hasina, the daughter of Bangladesh founder Sheikh Mujibur Rahman returned from India after more than five years exile that began after his assassination.  More than one million of her supporters turned out to welcome her return, and she urged the nation to work toward restoring democracy.
 30 May - Ziaur Rahman, President of Bangladesh, was assassinated as he spent the night in Chittagong.  Taking place at 4:00 am local time, the attack was planned by Major General Muhammed Manzur.  Lt. Col. Motiur Rahman shot and killed the pajama-clad President Ziaur.
 12 June - Abdus Sattar handed the key of historical 32 Dhanmondi House to Sheikh Hasina
 15 November - Abdus Sattar was confirmed as President of Bangladesh in an election suspected of being rigged.  Running on the Nationalist Party ticket as one of 23 candidates, Sattar, who had been the acting President since the May 30 assassination of Ziaur Rahman, officially received 14,217,601 votes, nearly two-thirds of those cast, while runner up Kamal Hossain of the Awami League got 5,694,884.

Awards and Recognitions

Independence Day Award

Ekushey Padak
 Abu Rushd Matinuddin (literature)
 Aminul Islam (fine arts)
 Abdul Halim Chowdhury (music)
 Mumtaz Ali Khan (music)
 Gauhar Jamil (dance)
 Mohammad Zakaria (drama)
 Zahur Hossain Chowdhury (journalism)
 Obaidul Huq (journalism)
 Mustafa Nurul Islam (literature)

Sports
 Domestic football:
 Abahani KC won Dhaka League title.
 Mohammedan SC won the title of Bangladesh Federation Cup.
 Cricket:
 Marylebone Cricket Club cricket team visited Bangladesh and played a number of friendly matches with the Bangladesh team.

Births
 Enamul Hossain, chess grandmaster

Deaths
 30 May: President Ziaur Rahman, Bir Uttam (b. 1936)
 24 June: Abdul Matin Chowdhury, academician (b. 1921)
 2 August: Syed A. B. Mahmud Hossain, jurist (b. 1916)
 7 August: Mahbubul Alam, author (b. 1898)
 9 October: Qazi Motahar Hossain, author (b. 1897)

See also 
 1980s in Bangladesh
 List of Bangladeshi films of 1981
 Timeline of Bangladeshi history

References